"Protection" is a song by Australian rapper Allday, released on 22 March 2019 as the second single from the Allday's third studio album Starry Night Over the Phone. The single was certified gold in Australia in 2021.

Reception
Al Newstead from Triple J said "'Protection' finds Allday lamenting on lost love in a cloud of woozy guitars and understated beats".

Track listing
Digital download
 "Protection" – 3:33

Certifications

References

Allday songs
2019 songs
2019 singles
Songs written by Allday